The croslet horseshoe bat (Rhinolophus coelophyllus) is a species of bat in the family Rhinolophidae. It is found in Laos, Malaysia, Myanmar, and Thailand.

Range and distribution
The species is locally common in Thailand, a population that may contain approximately 1,000 individuals. The bat is found in broad-leaved mixed deciduous to evergreen forests in a wide altitudinal range in Thailand, including in a number of protected conservation areas. The croslet horseshoe bat is recorded from Myanmar, Salaween River, Thailand, Western Malaysia, and Lao PDR.

References

Rhinolophidae
Mammals described in 1867
Taxonomy articles created by Polbot
Taxa named by Wilhelm Peters
Bats of Southeast Asia